Gaetano Fasanotti (1831–1882) was an Italian painter.

He was born and died in Milan. He trained under Giovanni Renica and was named professor of landscape painting to the Academy of Brera. Among his pupils were Guido Ricci, Eugenio Gignous and Leonardo Bazzaro.

References 

1831 births
1882 deaths
19th-century Italian painters
19th-century Italian male artists
Italian male painters
Painters from Milan
Academic staff of Brera Academy